Tragic Figure is an EP by the American post-punk band Savage Republic, released in 1984 by Independent Project Records. It was later appended to reissues of the band's debut album Tragic Figures.

Track listing

Personnel
Adapted from the Tragic Figure liner notes.
Savage Republic
 Philip Drucker (as Jackson Del Rey) – guitar (A1), percussion (B2)
 Mark Erskine – drums
 Bruce Licher – vocals (A1), bass guitar (B2)
 Jeff Long – bass guitar (A1, B1), monotone guitar (B2)

Release history

References

External links 
 

1984 EPs
Savage Republic albums